Edge computing is a distributed computing paradigm that brings computation and data storage closer to the sources of data. This is expected to improve response times and save bandwidth. Edge computing is an architecture rather than a specific technology, and a topology- and location-sensitive form of distributed computing.

The origins of edge computing lie in content distributed networks (CDNs) that were created in the late 1990s to serve web and video content from edge servers that were deployed close to users. In the early 2000s, these networks evolved to host applications and application components on edge servers, resulting in the first commercial edge computing services that hosted applications such as dealer locators, shopping carts, real-time data aggregators, and ad insertion engines.  The history of how CDNs created the first edge networks that later evolved into the first edge computing service in 2002, the name itself coined as a trademark for that service, was told in an episode of ACM SIGCOMM's Networking Channel. marking the 25th anniversary of the birth of CDNs.

Internet of things (IoT) is an example of edge computing. A common misconception is that edge and IoT are synonymous.

Definition
One definition of edge computing is the use of any type of computer program that delivers low latency nearer to the requests. Karim Arabi, in an IEEE DAC 2014 Keynote  and subsequently in an invited talk at MIT's MTL Seminar in 2015, defined edge computing broadly as all computing outside the cloud happening at the edge of the network, and more specifically in applications where real-time processing of data is required. In his definition, cloud computing operates on big data while edge computing operates on "instant data" that is real-time data generated by sensors or users.

The term is often used as synonymous with fog computing. This especially is quite relevant for small deployments. However, when the deployment size is large, e.g., for Smart Cities, fog computing can be a distinct layer between the Edge and the Cloud. Hence in such deployments, Edge layer is a distinct layer too which has specific responsibilities.

According to The State of the Edge report, edge computing concentrates on servers "in proximity to the last mile network". Alex Reznik, Chair of the ETSI MEC ISG standards committee, loosely defines the term by essentially suggesting that anything that's not a traditional data center could be the 'edge' for somebody.

Edge nodes used for game streaming are known as gamelets, which are usually one or two hops away from the client. Per Anand and Edwin say "the edge node is mostly one or two hops away from the mobile client to meet the response time constraints for real-time games' in the cloud gaming context."

Edge computing may employ virtualization technology to make it easier to deploy and run a wide range of applications on edge servers.

Concept 
The world's data is expected to grow 61% to 175 zettabytes by 2025. According to research firm Gartner, around 10% of enterprise-generated data is created and processed outside a traditional centralized data center or cloud. By 2025, the firm predicts that this figure will reach 75%. The increase of IoT devices at the edge of the network is producing a massive amount of data - storing and using all that data in cloud data centers pushes network bandwidth requirements to the limit. Despite the improvements of network technology, data centers cannot guarantee acceptable transfer rates and response times, which, however, often is a critical requirement for many applications. Furthermore, devices at the edge constantly consume data coming from the cloud, forcing companies to decentralize data storage and service provisioning, leveraging physical proximity to the end user.

In a similar way, the aim of edge computing is to move the computation away from data centers towards the edge of the network, exploiting smart objects, mobile phones, or network gateways to perform tasks and provide services on behalf of the cloud. By moving services to the edge, it is possible to provide content caching, service delivery, persistent data storage, and IoT management resulting in better response times and transfer rates. At the same time, distributing the logic to different network nodes introduces new issues and challenges.

Privacy and security 
The distributed nature of this paradigm introduces a shift in security schemes used in cloud computing. In edge computing, data may travel between different distributed nodes connected through the Internet and thus requires special encryption mechanisms independent of the cloud. Edge nodes may also be resource-constrained devices, limiting the choice in terms of security methods. Moreover, a shift from centralized top-down infrastructure to a decentralized trust model is required.
On the other hand, by keeping and processing data at the edge, it is possible to increase privacy by minimizing the transmission of sensitive information to the cloud. Furthermore, the ownership of collected data shifts from service providers to end-users.

Scalability 
Scalability in a distributed network must face different issues. First, it must take into account the heterogeneity of the devices, having different performance and energy constraints, the highly dynamic condition, and the reliability of the connections compared to more robust infrastructure of cloud data centers. Moreover, security requirements may introduce further latency in the communication between nodes, which may slow down the scaling process.

The state-of-the-art scheduling technique can increase the effective utilization of edge resources and scales the edge server by assigning minimum edge resources to each offloaded task.

Reliability 
Management of failovers is crucial in order to keep a service alive. If a single node goes down and is unreachable, users should still be able to access a service without interruptions. Moreover, edge computing systems must provide actions to recover from a failure and alert the user about the incident. To this aim, each device must maintain the network topology of the entire distributed system, so that detection of errors and recovery become easily applicable. Other factors that may influence this aspect are the connection technologies in use, which may provide different levels of reliability, and the accuracy of the data produced at the edge that could be unreliable due to particular environment conditions. As an example, an edge computing device, such as a voice assistant, may continue to provide service to local users even during cloud service or internet outages.

Speed 
Edge computing brings analytical computational resources close to the end users and therefore can increase the responsiveness and throughput of applications. A well-designed edge platform would significantly outperform a traditional cloud-based system. Some applications rely on short response times, making edge computing a significantly more feasible option than cloud computing. Examples range from IoT to autonomous driving, anything health or human / public safety relevant, or involving human perception such as facial recognition, which typically takes a human between 370-620 ms to perform. Edge computing is more likely to be able to mimic the same perception speed as humans, which is useful in applications such as augmented reality where the headset should preferably recognize who a person is at the same time as the wearer does.

Efficiency 
Due to the nearness of the analytical resources to the end users, sophisticated analytical tools and Artificial Intelligence tools can run on the edge of the system. This placement at the edge helps to increase operational efficiency and is responsible for many advantages to the system.

Additionally, the usage of edge computing as an intermediate stage between client devices and the wider internet results in efficiency savings that can be demonstrated in the following example: A client device requires computationally intensive processing on video files to be performed on external servers. By using servers located on a local edge network to perform those computations, the video files only need to be transmitted in the local network. Avoiding transmission over the internet results in significant bandwidth savings and therefore increases efficiency.  Another example is voice recognition. If the recognition is performed locally, it is possible to send the recognized text to the cloud rather than audio recordings, significantly reducing the amount of required bandwidth.

Applications 
Edge application services reduce the volumes of data that must be moved, the consequent traffic, and the distance that data must travel. That provides lower latency and reduces transmission costs. Computation offloading for real-time applications, such as facial recognition algorithms, showed considerable improvements in response times, as demonstrated in early research. Further research showed that using resource-rich machines called cloudlets or micro data centers near mobile users, which offer services typically found in the cloud, provided improvements in execution time when some of the tasks are offloaded to the edge node. On the other hand, offloading every task may result in a slowdown due to transfer times between device and nodes, so depending on the workload, an optimal configuration can be defined.

IoT-based power grid system enables communication of electricity and data to monitor and control the power grid, which makes energy management more efficient.

Another use of the architecture is cloud gaming, where some aspects of a game could run in the cloud, while the rendered video is transferred to lightweight clients running on devices such as mobile phones, VR glasses, etc. This type of streaming is also known as pixel streaming.

Other notable applications include connected cars, autonomous cars, smart cities, Industry 4.0 (smart industry), and home automation systems.

See also

Content delivery network
Dew computing
Edge data integration
Edge device
Fat client
Heterogeneous computing
Industry 4.0
Mobile edge computing
Personal computer
Serverless architecture
Smart camera
Ubiquitous computing

References 

Post-cloud computing architecture
Distributed computing architecture
Load balancing (computing)
Network performance
Networking hardware
Internet of things
Ambient intelligence